Parramore Sports F.C. was an English football club from Sheffield, South Yorkshire, but based later in its existence in Worksop, Nottinghamshire.

History
Parramore Sports was established in 1936 as the works team of ironfounders F Parramore & Sons. They played in local works leagues for a large part of their history before moving into  the Sheffield and Hallamshire County Senior League (S&HCSL) in 1985. They flitted between the Premier Division and Division 1 of the S&HCSL for nearly two decades before leaving for the Central Midlands League (CMFL) in 2008, playing at the Don Valley Stadium.

They were promoted to the Supreme Division of the CMFL after their first season in the competition, before changing name to Sheffield Parramore in 2010. Parramore won the CMFL Supreme Division title in 2011, earning promotion to the Northern Counties East League (NCEL). Prior to the start of their first NCEL season, Parramore manager Peter Whitehead bought Worksop Town's disused Sandy Lane ground and moved the club to the town, renaming them Worksop Parramore.

Their rise through the English football league system continued when they won promotion from NCEL Division 1 in their first season, earning a place in the FA Vase for the 2012–13 season. A year later they entered the FA Cup for the first time.

In 2013 the club merged with Handsworth F.C. to form Handsworth Parramore F.C. The new club entered step 5 of the English football league system for the start of the 2014–15 season, remaining at Sandy Lane.

Notable former players
Players that played in the Football League either before or after being with Parramore:

 Jamie Green
 Lee Thompson

League and cup history

Honours

League
Northern Counties East League
Promoted: 2011–12
Central Midlands League Supreme Division
Champions: 2010–11
Central Midlands League Premier Division
Promoted: 2008–09
Sheffield & Hallamshire County Senior League Division 1
Promoted: 1999-00

Cup
None

Records
Best League performance: 4th, Northern Counties East League Premier Division, 2013–14
Best FA Cup performance: 1st Qualifying Round, 2013–14
Best FA Vase performance: 2nd Round, 2013–14
Record attendance: 157 vs Scarborough Athletic, Northern Counties East League Premier Division, 2012–13

References

External links
Club website

Association football clubs established in 1936
Defunct football clubs in Nottinghamshire
Defunct football clubs in South Yorkshire
1936 establishments in England
Association football clubs disestablished in 2013
2013 disestablishments in England
Northern Counties East Football League
Central Midlands Football League
Sheffield & Hallamshire County Senior Football League
Works association football teams in England